See Grace Fly is a 2003 independent film directed and written by Pete McCormack and starring Gina Chiarelli and Paul McGillion. Its dramatic and often heartwrenching plot revolve around siblings, Grace and Dominic McKinley as they struggle to cope with their mother's death and Grace's mental illness.

Plot
Grace McKinley is a brilliant 38-year-old woman with schizophrenia. When her mother dies, Grace's actions become increasingly erratic. She takes two weeks to report the death, and in that time is sent a shattering message that only she can decipher.

Grace's younger brother Dominic is a repressed yet courageous missionary working in war-ravaged Sierra Leone. Called home to arrange his mother's funeral, he is at the same time forced to deal with Grace's uncertain future and their forgotten past. The problem is, wanted by the police for questioning, and with her life threatened, Grace has disappeared onto the streets of Vancouver, fuelled by an indomitable will to spread her secret to the masses.

Kate Wilkens—Dominic's past love interest and Grace's psychiatrist—and Dominic's childhood buddy James, a priest, combine with Grace's fiercely loyal best friend Gigi and her punchy husband Ralph to round out those searching for Grace. But in the days leading up to the funeral the question of who actually needs to be saved becomes less and less clear, and the truth of Grace's convictions threaten to shatter all Dominic's beliefs, and both of their lives, to where death may be the only way to freedom…

Driven by the courage of love and the agony of mental illness, See Grace Fly slams heart first into faith, death, sex and family, offering a gripping look at the precarious balance between belief and reality.

Cast
 Gina Chiarelli - Grace McKinley 
 Paul McGillion - Dominic McKinley 
 Jennifer Copping - Kate Wilkins 
 Tom Scholte - Father James
 Benjamin Ratner - Ralph Devito
 Megan Leitch - Gigi Devito

Rest of cast in alphabetical order
 Linden Banks - Principal 
 Brendan Beiser - Funeral Director 
 Frank Borg - Bubba Binski 
 Garvin Cross - Walt 
 Rick Dobran - Sammy 
 Mike Dopud - Steve 
 Marcy Goldberg - Young Connie 
 Matt Hill - School Security Guard 
 Matt Hill - Leo 
 Michael Kopsa - Mr. McKinley 
 Edith Lando - Connie 
 David Lewis - Gerry 
 David Lovgren - Terry 
 Michael P. Northey - CBS Security Guard 
 Wesley Salter - Chicken Boy 
 Jade Shaw - Cheryl 
 Christopher Shyer - Bloody-nosed Travestite 
 Jackson-Day Washington - Young Dominic
 Tatiana Stellingwerff - Young Grace

Press

 "On Sunday, Gina Chiarelli received two much-deserved standing ovations for her grippingly honest, tour-de-force performance as a schizophrenic who prophesizes the end of the world in Pete McCormack's See Grace Fly . This quasi-mystical story, which follows a brilliantly troubled woman and the voices that torment her through the streets of Vancouver, marks the directorial debut for author of the Stephen Leacock Medal for Humour-nominated comic novel Understanding Ken.” 
- Alexandra Gill, the Globe and Mail

 "First-time directors from Vancouver were the talk of the festival circuit this year…audiences leapt to their feet for Pete McCormack and his film about a schizophrenic woman, See Grace Fly." 
- Amy Carmichael, Ottawa Citizen

 “Gina Chiarelli is marvelous…” “Paul McGillion is excellent…”
 “…one of the most brilliant films to tackle religious themes since Jesus of Montreal…” 
- La Presse

 “…heart-wrenching…” - The Globe and Mail
 “…emotionally shattering…”
 “…roles as juicy as this are an actor's recurring dream come true…”
 “…McCormack's writing is a reminder that words really do help in the lost art of communication…”
 “…Chiarelli's possessed portrayal of a brilliant 38-year-old woman out to warn the world that the end is nigh is the reason awards were invented…” 
- John Griffin, The Montreal Gazette

 "...Grace McKinley is a distressingly believable character...she has the power to draw you into a world you might not come out of..." 
-  Maurie Alioff, Cine Festival

 "The best Canadian feature...was screenwriter (The Blue Butterfly, Whirlygirl) and novelist Pete McCormack’s See Grace Fly, a measured, humane portrayal of illness that most films don’t make time for. Already a double winner at last year’s Vancouver festival..., the film sketches a few days in the life of Grace, a 38-year-old schizophrenic convinced the apocalypse is about to come to pass.
 Measured and aggressive in its study of faith and illness, McCormack’s directorial debut dispenses with serial beauty shots (think Russell Crowe’s animated, frenzied manias in A Beautiful Mind) to foreground two brilliant performances from Gina Chiarelli as Grace and Paul McGillion as her brother Dominic, a lay missionary who has returned home to sort out the messy details of his mother’s death under Grace’s watch." 
-  Filmmaker Magazine

Awards (Won)
 Vancouver Film Festival, 2003 (Canada): Best Feature Film - Special Citation 
 Vancouver Film Festival, 2003 (Canada): Women in Film Award, Juried Prize - Gina Chiarelli
 Fantasporto 2004 (Portugal): Best Film, Audience Jury Award
 Leo Award 2004: Best Performance by a Lead Female, Gina Chiarelli (Canada)

Awards (Nominations)
 Leo Award 2004: Best Direction, Pete McCormack
 Leo Award 2004: Best Feature Length Drama
 Leo Award 2004: Best Lead Performance by a Male, Paul McGillion
 Leo Award 2004: Best Screenwriting, Pete McCormack
 Genie Award 2006: Best Performance by an Actress in a Leading Role, Gina Chiarelli

External links
 official film site

 official pete mccormack site
 official paul mcgillion site

English-language Canadian films
2003 films
2003 directorial debut films
Canadian drama films
Films shot in British Columbia
Films directed by Pete McCormack
2000s Canadian films